The Standing Committee on Family and Cultural Affairs is a standing committee of the Parliament of Norway. It is responsible for policies relating to families, children and youth, gender equality, consumer affairs and cultural affairs. It corresponds to the Ministry of Culture and the Ministry of Children and Equality. The committee has 10 members and is chaired by Svein Harberg of the Conservative Party.

Members 2009–13

References

Standing committees of the Storting